Australia competed at the 2020 Winter Youth Olympics in Lausanne, Switzerland from 9 to 22 January 2020.

Medalists
Medals awarded to participants of mixed-NOC teams are represented in italics. These medals are not counted towards the individual NOC medal tally.

Alpine skiing

Boys

Girls

Biathlon

Boys

Girls

Mixed

Cross-country skiing

Boys

Girls

Freestyle skiing

 Abi Harrigan
 Mia Rennie
 Gus Broersen
 Zoe Michael
 Kyra Wheatley
 Ben Wynn
 Jasper Cobcroft

Ice hockey

 Nikki Sharp
 Courtney Mahoney
 Molly Lukowiak
 Ebony Brunt
 Sai Lake
 Riley Langille

Short track speed skating

Two Australian skaters achieved quota places for Australia based on the results of the 2019 World Junior Short Track Speed Skating Championships. but choose to use only one quota.

Boys

Snowboarding

 Lily Jekel
 Alexandra Chen
 Sunny Steele
 Amber Essex
 Josie Baff
 Finn Sadler

See also
Australia at the 2020 Summer Olympics

References

2020 in Australian sport
Nations at the 2020 Winter Youth Olympics
Australia at the Youth Olympics